Arnoldius scissor is a species of ant, one of three species described in the genus Arnoldius. Native to Australia, it was described by Crawley in 1922.

References

Dolichoderinae
Hymenoptera of Australia
Insects described in 1922